The Asian leaf turtle (Cyclemys dentata) is a species of turtle found in Southeast Asia. They are quite common in the pet trade; their carapaces resemble that of a Cuora amboinensis hybrid.

Feeding 
This species is omnivorous and feeds on vegetation and fruits, and also mollusks, crustaceans and fish. It is also known to be scavenger and very often seen to take carrion.

Behavior 
The Asian leaf turtle is quite elusive and sighting is uncommon. It is not strong swimmer preferring instead to walk on the bottom of a body of water rather than swimming freely. According to Das, the adult spends its nights on land and moves to water during the day. It will squirt its digestive system contents when it feels threatened.

Size 
Asian leaf turtles can grow 6 to 9.5 inches (15 to 24 cm) long and 4.5 to 6.5 inches in width.

Distribution 
The turtle can be found in North India, North-east India (Manipur), Bangladesh, Myanmar (Burma), Thailand, Cambodia, Vietnam, West Malaysia, Indonesia (Sumatra, Java, Borneo, Bali), Philippines (Palawan: Calamian Islands etc.), and China.

This species is found up to 1,200 m of elevation, but the depth range is unknown.

References 

 
 
 
 
 Gray, J.E. 1857 Notice of some Indian tortoises (including the description of a new species presented to the British Museum by Professor Oldham). Ann. Mag. Nat. Hist. (2) 19: 342-344
 Gray, J.E. 1864 Observations on the box tortoises, with the description of three new Asiatic species. Ann. Mag. Nat. Hist. (3) 13: 105-111
 Gray, J.E. 1873 On the original form, development, and cohesion of the bones of the sternum of chelonians; with notes on the skeleton of Sphargis. Ann. Mag. nat. Hist. (4) 11: 161-172

External links 
 
 Asian Leaf Turtles

Reptiles of India
Reptiles of the Philippines
Turtles of Asia
Cyclemys
Reptiles described in 1831